Hugues de Bagratide (1890-1960) was a stage and film actor. Born in Constantinople of Armenian descent, he spent his working life in France. Because of his ethnic background he was cast in a variety of non-European roles. He appeared as judges and public officials, of both clearly different ethnicities and non-defined ones as well.

Selected filmography
 Mandrin (1924)
 Princess Masha (1927)
 The New Men (1936)
 The Phantom Gondola (1936)
 The Lover of Madame Vidal (1936)
 The Five Cents of Lavarede (1939)
 Miquette (1940)
 Death on the Run (1954)

References

Bibliography
 Klossner, Michael. The Europe of 1500-1815 on Film and Television: A Worldwide Filmography of Over 2550 Works, 1895 Through 2000. McFarland & Company, 2002.

External links

1890 births
1960 deaths
French male film actors
French male silent film actors
20th-century French male actors
French male stage actors
Emigrants from the Ottoman Empire to France
Turkish emigrants to France
Male actors from Istanbul
French people of Armenian descent
Armenians from the Ottoman Empire